John Battista Mastrangelo (March 10, 1926 – October 2, 1987) was a professional football player in the National Football League. He made his NFL debut in 1947 with the Pittsburgh Steelers. He played in the NFL for 4 years, playing for the Steelers, New York Yankees and New York Giants over the course of his career.

Prior to joining the NFL, Mastrangelo played college football at the University of Notre Dame where he received All-American honors. He also played in the College All-Star Game in 1947.

Notes

1926 births
1987 deaths
Players of American football from Pennsylvania
American football guards
Pittsburgh Steelers players
New York Yankees (NFL) players
New York Giants players
Notre Dame Fighting Irish football players
People from Vandergrift, Pennsylvania